William “Bill” G. Spears (born 1938) is an American asset manager, philanthropist and board member. Spears is currently chairman, chief executive officer and co-founder of Spears Abacus Advisors LLC, an investment management firm located in New York City.

Early life and education 

Spears graduated from Choate Rosemary Hall in 1956. He received his undergraduate degree from Princeton University in 1960 and his M.B.A. from Harvard Business School in 1962.

Business 

Spears began his career at Loeb, Rhoades & Company in 1962 and was named a general partner in 1970. In 1972, Spears founded an independent investment advisory business, which became Spears, Benzak, Salomon & Farrell. The firm was acquired by KeyCorp in 1994; Spears served as chairman and chief executive officer of KeyCorp Asset Management from 1996 to 1999. At the time, KeyCorp Asset Management managed $72 billion in total assets. In 1999, he co-founded Spears, Grisanti & Brown.

In 2007, Spears co-founded Spears Abacus Advisors LLC in partnership with Abacus & Associates. He serves as the firm's chairman and chief executive officer.

Boards 

Spears’ past corporate board affiliations include UnitedHealth Group, Recognition International Inc., Avatar Holdings Inc. and Osborn Communications Corp. Spears served as director of UnitedHealth Group for 15 years until his resignation in 2006.

Honors and Philanthropy 

Spears served as a trustee at Choate Rosemary Hall from 1979 to 1991 and became a Life Trustee in 1996. He was chairman of the board of trustees from 1982 to 1987. He established the Spears Endowment for Spiritual and Moral Education at Choate.

Spears served as a trustee at Quinnipiac University from 1993 to 2005 and was chairman of the board of trustees from 2000 to 2005. He is a Trustee Emeritus at Quinnipiac and in 1998 received an Honorary Doctorate of Laws from the School of Law. In 2006, he was inducted into the Business Leader Hall of Fame.

Spears became a trustee of the HealthCare Chaplaincy in 1993 and a life trustee in 2001. He served as the organization's chairman from 1996 to 2000. He established The Spears Research Institute in 1998. The institute researches the relationship between spirituality and health.

From 2009 to 2016 Spears served as a trustee of the Nantucket Atheneum. He served as vice chairman of the board for a portion of that time.

Spears served as a trustee of Union Theological Seminary from 2000 to 2007 and as vice chairman during a portion of that time.

Spears is a Life Trustee at the  Asian Cultural Council after serving as a trustee from 2013 to 2019.

Personal life 

William G. Spears was married to Joan Spears née Bogardus from 1960 until her death in 2002. They had four children together.

Spears married Maria T. Spears in 2003. Mrs. Spears, widowed in 2000, has a daughter from her earlier marriage. They live in New York City.

References 

1938 births
Living people
American chairpersons of corporations
American chief executives
American investment advisors
American philanthropists
Choate Rosemary Hall alumni
Harvard Business School alumni
Princeton University alumni
Quinnipiac University people